Opsaridium ubangiense is a species of ray-finned fish in the family Cyprinidae. It is found in coastal basins from Cameroon to the Republic of the Congo. It is also found in upper tributaries of Lake Chad and the Benue River, and the Congo River basin.

References

Opsaridium
Fish described in 1901
Freshwater fish of Africa